Benjamin Thompson (August 5, 1798 – September 24, 1852) was a U.S. Representative from Massachusetts.

Born in Charlestown, Massachusetts, Thompson attended the public schools, and then engaged in mercantile pursuits.  He served as member of the Massachusetts House of Representatives 1830–1831 and 1833–1836.  He served in the Massachusetts Senate in 1841.

Thompson was elected as a Whig to the Twenty-ninth Congress (March 4, 1845 – March 3, 1847).  He declined to be a candidate for renomination in 1846.

Thompson was elected to the Thirty-second Congress and served from March 4, 1851, until his death in Charlestown, Massachusetts, September 24, 1852.  He was interred in the Congressional Cemetery, Washington, D.C.

See also
List of United States Congress members who died in office (1790–1899)

References

1798 births
1852 deaths
Burials at the Congressional Cemetery
Politicians from Boston
Members of the Massachusetts House of Representatives
Massachusetts state senators
Whig Party members of the United States House of Representatives from Massachusetts
19th-century American politicians